Jacques Chazot, (b. 25 September 1928 in Locmiquélic (Morbihan), d. 12 July 1993 in Monthyon (Seine-et-Marne) was a French dancer and socialite.

Biography
He joined Opéra de Paris in 1947 as a dancer. In 1956, he joined Opéra-Comique. The same year, he wrote Les Carnets de Marie-Chantal, creating a character who is the archetype of the snobbish socialite.

He was a very close friend of Françoise Sagan, Juliette Gréco, Régine, Claude Bessy, Hassan II among others and a companion of Coco Chanel.

He became famous through television, dancing in many television shows of the 1970s. He was at the time one of the few people to appear on television as openly gay.

He had oral cancer. In his last years he lived in a castle of Monthyon, a property in the vicinity of Paris owned by Jean-Claude Brialy.

Bibliography
 Les carnets de Marie-Chantal, Van Moppès, 1956
 Sophie Ripaille, R. Julliard, 1960
 Pense-bêtes, R. Solar, 1964
 Chazot Jacques, Paris, Stock, 1975, 238 p.
 À nous deux les femmes, Olivier Orban, 1978
 La mémoire des autres, Mengès, 1982
 Marie-Chantal de gauche !, Mengès, 1983

References 

1928 births
1993 deaths
French male dancers
Deaths from cancer in France
Deaths from oral cancer
French LGBT entertainers
20th-century French LGBT people